The 2012–13 KBL season was the 18th season of the Korean Basketball League (KBL), the highest level of basketball in South Korea. Ulsan Hyundai Mobis Phoebus won the title for the fourth time.

Clubs

Regular season

Playoffs

References

External links
  

Korean Basketball League seasons